Daping Township is a rural township in Shaoshan City, Xiangtan City, Hunan Province, China.

Administrative division
The township is divided into nine villages: Xiangshao Village, Shaoxin Village, Shaofeng Village, Huangtian Village, Meihua Village, Linjiawan Village, Xinlian Village, Daping Village, and Zhuzan Village.

Economy
Rice, sweet potato, pig, and soybean are important to the economy.

Education
There are seven primary schools and one public junior high school in the town.

Gallery

References

Historic township-level divisions of Shaoshan